"Perfect Strangers" is a song by the British hard rock band Deep Purple. It is the title track of their 1984 comeback album Perfect Strangers.

It is one of the few Deep Purple compositions to not feature a guitar solo. Nevertheless, founding band member and guitarist Ritchie Blackmore has called it his favorite Deep Purple song. The lyrics are inspired by the Elric books by Michael Moorcock.

Covers
Dimmu Borgir on their album Abrahadabra as a bonus track. 
Progressive metal band Dream Theater on their EP A Change of Seasons. Dream Theater also performed it live on a BBC Radio show with Iron Maiden vocalist Bruce Dickinson singing the lead vocals. The band also performed it under the pseudonym Nightmare Cinema at interludes during their concerts when they would switch instruments.
Hard rock vocalist Jørn Lande on his solo album Unlocking the Past.
Finnish duo Timo Kotipelto and Jani Liimatainen during live performances and on their studio album Blackoustic.
American doom metal band Yob covered Perfect Strangers as a standalone single.

Personnel
 Ritchie Blackmore – guitar
 Ian Gillan – vocals
 Roger Glover – bass
 Jon Lord – organ
 Ian Paice – drums

Charts

Appearances
 It was used by Extreme Championship Wrestling wrestler "Crippler" Chris Benoit and then for the TRIPLE THREAT of "The Franchise" Shane Douglas, "The Shooter" Dean Malenko and Benoit as an entrance theme. The stable was meant to reference the carnival era trio whence a good looking talker would be protected by grapplers that could either "shoot" (legit wrestle), or "hook / cripple" a large challenger. Soundalike versions were used for his later runs in World Championship Wrestling and Total Nonstop Action Wrestling.

References

Deep Purple songs
1984 songs
Songs written by Ian Gillan
Songs written by Roger Glover
Songs written by Ritchie Blackmore